Metapolybia aztecoides is a species of vespid wasp.

Taxonomy and phylogeny
Metapolybia is a small genus of neotropical paper wasps that are found within the tribe Epiponini and the subfamily Polistinae. The most recent revision of the genus recognizes 11 different species within Metapolybia. Metapolybia aztecoides is most often studied with other species of the Metapolybia genus, like Metapolybia suffusa and Metapolybia docilis.

Description and identification

Distribution and habitat

Colony cycle

Behavior

References 

Vespidae
Hymenoptera of South America